General elections were held in Bosnia and Herzegovina on 7 October 2018. They decided the makeup of Bosnia and Herzegovina's Presidency as well as national, entity, and cantonal governments. Voter turnout was 54%.

The elections for the House of Representatives were divided into two; one for the Federation of Bosnia and Herzegovina and one for Republika Srpska. In the presidential election, voters in the Federation elected Bosniak Šefik Džaferović and Croat Željko Komšić, while voters in Republika Srpska elected Serb Milorad Dodik. The Party of Democratic Action emerged as the largest party in the House of Representatives, winning 9 of the 42 seats.

Electoral system
The three members of the Presidency are elected by plurality. In Republika Srpska voters elect the Serb representative, whilst in the Federation of Bosnia and Herzegovina voters elect the Bosniak and Croat members. Voters registered in the Federation of Bosnia and Herzegovina can vote for either the Bosniak or Croat candidate, but cannot vote in both elections.

The 42 members of the House of Representatives are elected by open list proportional representation in two constituencies, the Federation of Bosnia and Herzegovina and Republika Srpska. These two constituencies are subsequently divided in eight electoral units.

A total of 3,352,933 citizens were registered to vote; 2,092,336 in the Federation and 1,260,597 in Republika Srpska (citizens living in Brčko District voted in one of the entities). There were 77,814 persons registered to vote outside of Bosnia and Herzegovina, out of which 76,729 persons were registered to vote by mail and 1,085 were registered to vote at diplomatic missions.

Results
Turnout at the level of Bosnia and Herzegovina was 53.36%; the Federation 51.25%; Republika Srpska 57.30% and Brčko District 46.81%. The percentage was slightly lower as compared to 2014 that was 54.14%. The Bosnian Central Election Commission (CEC) reported that all 5,714 polling stations closed down in time or with slight delay. According to the initial assessment by the CEC, the elections passed in an overall calm and peaceful atmosphere.

Presidency
The elected members of the national Presidency were Šefik Džaferović (Bosniak, SDA), Željko Komšić (Croat, DF) and Milorad Dodik (Serb, SNSD). There was controversy over the election of the Croat member, as the non-nationalist candidate Željko Komšić (Democratic Front) won against the nationalist Dragan Čović (HDZ BiH) with the help of Bosniak voters, with Komšić winning first place almost exclusively in municipalities without a Croat relative majority. The result prompted protests of Croats accusing Bosniaks of out-voting and calling for the creation of their own entity or electoral constituency. In the following days, protests were held in Mostar with signs "Not my president".
In the days following election, several municipalities with Croat majority declared Komšić persona non grata.

House of Representatives

By entity

Reactions
Following the results and Željko Komšić's election to the Presidency, largely due to votes in majority Bosniak areas, Croatian Prime Minister Andrej Plenković, who endorsed the incumbent Presidency member Dragan Čović, criticized Komšić's victory: "We are again in a situation where members of one constituent people ... are electing a representative of another, the Croat people". Komšić responded that the Croatian Government is undermining Bosnia and Herzegovina and its sovereignty.

See also
2018 Federation of Bosnia and Herzegovina general election
2018 Republika Srpska general election

Further reading

References

External links
Central Election Committee BiH

Elections in Bosnia and Herzegovina
Bosnia
2018 in Bosnia and Herzegovina